The Niululing Dam is a gravity dam on a tributary of the Wanquan River in Hainan Province, China. The dam serves to produce hydroelectricity and protect against floods. Plans for the dam began in 1965 and construction began in 1976. All four generators were commissioned between 1979 and 1982. Its power station has an 80 MW installed capacity.

See also

List of major power stations in Hainan
List of dams and reservoirs in China

References

Dams in China
Hydroelectric power stations in Hainan
Gravity dams
Dams completed in 1982
1982 establishments in China